Elathur may refer to:

 Elathur, Erode, a panchayat in Erode district, Tamil Nadu
 Elathur, Kozhikode, a panchayat in Kozhikode district, Kerala
 Elathur River, a river in Kozhikode district, Kerala